The 1997 Asian Youth Girls Volleyball Championship was held in Khanarassadornbamrung Gymnasium, Yala, Thailand from 14 to 20 April 1997.

Results

|}

|}

Final standing

Awards
MVP:  Midori Takahashi
Best Scorer:  Mari Ochiai
Best Spiker:  Lee Yun-hui
Best Blocker:  Rattana Sanguanrum
Best Server:  Tian Jia

External links
 www.asianvolleyball.org
FIVB

A
V
V
Asian women's volleyball championships